Fergana massacre happened in 1989, after riots broke out between the Meskhetian Turks exiled in Uzbekistan and the native Uzbeks. Hundreds of Meskhetian Turks were killed or injured, nearly 1,000 properties were destroyed and thousands of Meskhetian Turks fled into exile.

Since their World War II deportation, Meskhetian Turks were not allowed to return to their homeland.  They continued living in Central Asia, primarily in Uzbekistan, until June 1989, when Uzbek extremists took part in a mass slaughter of the Meskhetian Turks and other minorities in the Fergana Valley. According to official, and most probably low figures, 97 people died, over 1,000 were wounded and 752 houses destroyed. Before the massacre, about 100,000 Meskhetian Turks lived in Uzbekistan.

Aftermath 
Authorities in Moscow and Tashkent quickly claimed that the riots were planned by the mafia, the political enemies of Gorbachev or by Uzbek nationalists.

Following this events, the majority of Meskhetian Turks, about 70,000, went to Azerbaijan, whilst the remainder went to various regions of Russia (especially Krasnodar Krai), Kazakhstan, Kyrgyzstan and Ukraine. Many Bukharan Jews also fled to Israel.

See also
 1990 Dushanbe riots
 Osh riots (1990)

References

Bibliography 
 
 

1989 riots
June 1989 events in Asia
Ethnic riots
Riots and civil disorder in the Soviet Union
Massacres in the Soviet Union
Persecution of Turkish people
Massacres in Uzbekistan
Bukharan Jews
1989 murders in the Soviet Union